Vermont Route 35 (VT 35) is a  north–south state highway in southeastern Vermont, United States. It runs from an intersection with VT 30 in Townshend north to an intersection with VT 11 in Chester. The entirety of VT 35 is town-maintained.

Route description
VT 35 begins at the intersection with VT 30 in Townshend. VT 35 and VT 121 run concurrently to the northwest for a few miles into the center of Grafton. VT 121 splits off to the west, while VT 35 turns due north, continuing into the town of Chester, where it ends at an intersection with VT 11. A short section of VT 35 in Athens was gravel until 2018, when the road was fully paved.

Major intersections

References

External links

035
Transportation in Windham County, Vermont
Transportation in Windsor County, Vermont